World's Wildest Police Videos (shortened to Police Videos in Season 4) is an American reality TV series that ran on Fox from 1998 to 2001. In 2012, Spike announced that it had commissioned 13 new episodes with the revival of the original name and John Bunnell returning as host, which premiered on May 7, 2012, and ended on August 13, 2012. The series deals with police videos from across the world. Video footage of car chases, subsequent arrests, robberies, riots and other crimes appear on the show.

Production
World's Wildest Police Videos began in 1998 and ran for four seasons, comprising a total of 56 episodes, before being officially cancelled in 2002. In Season 4, the name was shortened to Police Videos.

Most of the police videos featured on the show were from various U.S. police departments, but footage from other nations such as Argentina, South Korea, Brazil, Russia, Australia, New Zealand, and the United Kingdom also appeared. Video sources included cameras from police cars, helicopters, store security systems, news reporters, and private citizens from around the world. Much of the footage had previously only been seen by law enforcement officials.

The show became popular with viewers. It had the highest ratings of any Fox network television special to that date. It was also featured on Entertainment Tonight and was re-aired later that month. It was the first sweeps-month special ever to run twice during a sweeps period by Fox.

Format
The series began with the series of specials entitled World's Scariest Police Chases, which was broadcast on February 2, 1997. It was narrated by actor Peter Coyote, and featured commentary by Captain C. W. Jensen of the Portland Police Bureau. Five additional episodes of World's Scariest Police Chases aired, with the second on April 27, 1997, third on November 4, 1997, fourth on February 17, 1998, fifth on April 28, 1998, and the sixth on April 29, 1999.

A further two special episodes called World's Scariest Police Shootouts aired around this time as well. It was hosted by John Bunnell, a retired police officer and former Sheriff of Multnomah County, Oregon.  The two episodes focused on police shootouts rather than chases themselves, although some of the clips featured a car chase along with a shootout. The first episode of World's Scariest Police Shootouts aired on May 15, 1997, and the second episode, World's Scariest Police Shootouts 2, aired on April 23, 1998. Both episodes were narrated and hosted by John Bunnell. The episodes featured more well-known content, such as the North Hollywood shootout, the murder of Darrell Lunsford, the 1991 Sacramento hostage crisis, White supremacist Chevie Kehoe and his shootout with police, and the 1996 Honolulu hostage crisis.

Eventually, the show was broadcast weekly. Bunnell's commentary was often characterized by puns, multiple clichés, over-dramatic descriptions of the struggle between good and evil, the police and criminals, victims and abusers, etc. Although Bunnell hosted and commented on most of the show, most police video segments were dubbed with the actual law enforcement officials acting in the situation presented. Tire screeching noises, horn beeps, automobile collision sounds and sirens are often overdubbed into these segments; this is especially noticeable in footage where vehicles are driving over dry grass or sand.

It has been widely noticed that the same voice is used in almost every helicopter footage scene, regardless of the location the footage is from. This uncredited role is said to be that of Lawrence Welk III, who usually goes by "Larry Welk," and is a reporter and helicopter traffic pilot for KCAL-TV and KCBS-TV in Los Angeles. He is also the grandson of famed musician Lawrence Welk.

Originally, a typical episode included sections entitled: "PIT maneuver," "Car Thieves," "Rainy Chase," "Big Rig Road Block," "Jumping Off Bridge," and "Drunk Drivers." This was dropped after the first season, and replaced with a string of clips, each commentated on by Bunnell. After a few videos, a small clip of Bunnell would be shown, often describing the police mentality behind the videos that were about to appear.

Occasionally, episodes were dedicated to police officers killed in the line of duty and an episode featured the footage of the crash of Ethiopian Airlines Flight 961 in 1996.

A video game based on the series was released for the PlayStation in 2001, entitled World's Scariest Police Chases, also featuring Bunnell. The game received mixed reviews, ranging from a 3.6/10 from GameSpot.com, to a 9/10 from Official PlayStation Magazine (UK).

There were also home video releases on VHS of the first three World's Scariest Police Chases around late 1997, which included never-before-seen footage that wasn't shown on FOX. The specials would be re-released as Deluxe Versions, with minor differences.

Series overview

Episodes

Specials (1997–2003)

Season 1 (1998)

Season 2 (1998–99)

Season 3 (1999–00)

Season 4 (2000–01)

Season 5 (2012)

In pop culture
In the Family Guy episode "Quagmire's Baby", there is a sequence of Fred Flintstone fleeing from the police in the family car, in an episode of World's Wildest Police Videos. Flintstone crashes, and attempts to flee on foot, but is delayed by the Hanna-Barbera skidaddle running effect. A similar sequence was used in the episode "Something, Something, Something, Dark Side", when TIE fighters and a Star Destroyer were chasing the Millennium Falcon. These sequences were narrated by Bunnell himself.

It was also parodied on MADtv as "World's Queeniest Police Chases".

Some of the Alarm für Cobra 11 - Die Autobahnpolizei, Der Clown and one from Die Wache car crashing clips were used in 2 episodes in 1998.

Worldwide syndication

Americas 
 United States: April 2, 1998 – September 7, 2001 on Fox. The series was syndicated on both CourtTV/TruTV from 2002–11, and on Spike TV/Spike until 2015. It was also seen as World's Most Dramatic Police Chases in the early morning on TNT. Spanish language re-runs were also syndicated on Telemundo.
 Mexico: Televisa
 Latin America: truTV Latin America
 Canada: mentv, CourtTV Canada
 Brazil: weekly (Sunday) mash-up show consisting of 4 shows mixed together. Aired on Universal Channel.

Europe 
 Hungary: Viasat 6
 Sweden: Aired and rerun on ZTV.
 Norway: Viasat 4
 Germany: on RTL, called Im Einsatz, die spektakulärsten Polizei-Videos der Welt, commentated by former American police officer Stephan T. Rose.
 Ireland: TV3
 Iceland: SkjárEinn (2000-2001)
 United Kingdom: Bravo, ITV4, Channel 5, Men & Motors and CBS Reality
 Greece: Skai TV
 Italy: AXN Italy

Asia 
 Indonesia: antv, NET.
 United Arab Emirates: MBC Action
 Malaysia: Star TV
 Philippines: Studio 23
 Thailand: UBC series

Oceania 
 Australia: Some premiere episodes were shown on the Seven Network and Network Ten, and re-runs of all episodes appeared on Fox8. Episodes of the 2012 series began airing on the Seven Network in 2013.

Africa 
 South Africa: DStv

References

External links

1990s American crime television series
2000s American crime television series
1998 American television series debuts
2001 American television series endings
2010s American crime television series
2012 American television series debuts
2012 American television series endings
Fox Broadcasting Company original programming
Television series by 20th Century Fox Television
Spike (TV network) original programming
2010s American reality television series
Telemundo original programming
TruTV original programming
English-language television shows
American television series revived after cancellation